Mario Castro can refer to:

 Mario Castro (footballer) (1923–1983), Chilean footballer
 Mario Castro (gymnast) (born 1962), Cuban Olympic gymnast
 Mario Castro (rower) (born 1961), Chilan Olympic rower